The 1993–94 Philadelphia Flyers season was the Flyers' 27th season in the National Hockey League (NHL). For the fifth consecutive season, the Flyers failed to make the playoffs.

Off-season
Mike Eaves was hired to replace Ken Hitchcock, who left to become the head coach of the Kalamazoo Wings of the International Hockey League, as an assistant coach under new head coach Terry Simpson. Simpson named Kevin Dineen captain and made Eric Lindros an alternate captain to groom him for a leadership role.

Regular season
This season began on a brighter note, as the club raced out to an 11–3–0 record. A loss to the Toronto Maple Leafs at Maple Leaf Gardens on November 6 signaled a sharp downturn, however. Lindros went down with his second knee injury in as many years and soon after, the Penguins routed the Flyers 11–5 in Pittsburgh.

Other lowlights on the slide included a 6–0 loss in Calgary, and an 8–0 defeat in the club's first-ever road game against the Dallas Stars in early January. Lindros netted an impressive hat-trick in an 8–3 win over the Blues later in the month, but an 0–6–1 slide placed the team out of playoff contention.

Despite Simpson's efforts to employ a defensive system akin to the yet-to-be unleashed neutral zone trap, the team continued to crack with Dominic Roussel and Tommy Soderstrom in net. Soderstrom struggled with heart ailments and bad luck all season, winning just six games. After climbing within three points of eighth-seeded Washington in late March, the Flyers finished the year 2–5–3 and rested in sixth place in the Atlantic Division, three points behind the expansion Florida Panthers.

Mark Recchi recorded 107 points (40 goals, 67 assists) and Lindros 97 (44 goals, 53 assists). Rod Brind'Amour improved with another 97 (35 goals, 62 assists) and Mikael Renberg set a Flyers rookie record with 82 points. Philadelphia had the best shooting percentage of all 26 teams, scoring 294 goals on 2,409 shots (12.2%). Offense was generated as the Flyers had four 30-goal scorers for the second-straight season and averaged 3.5 goals per game, but they still failed to clinch a playoff berth, again falling four points short of the final playoff spot.

After the season, Ed Snider had decided he had seen enough of Russ Farwell as general manager, and began courting Bobby Clarke to leave his GM post with the Florida Panthers to return to Philadelphia. Farwell's last move was firing Simpson after a lackluster season.

Season standings

Schedule and results

Regular season

|- style="background:#cfc;"
| 1 || October 5 || Pittsburgh Penguins || 4–3 || 1–0–0 || 2 || 
|- style="background:#cfc;"
| 2 || October 9 || @ Hartford Whalers || 5–2 || 2–0–0 || 4 || 
|- style="background:#fcf;"
| 3 || October 10 || Toronto Maple Leafs || 4–5 || 2–1–0 || 4 || 
|- style="background:#cfc;"
| 4 || October 12 || Buffalo Sabres || 5–3 || 3–1–0 || 6 || 
|- style="background:#cfc;"
| 5 || October 15 || @ Washington Capitals || 3–0 || 4–1–0 || 8 || 
|- style="background:#cfc;"
| 6 || October 16 || New York Rangers || 4–3 || 5–1–0 || 10 || 
|- style="background:#cfc;"
| 7 || October 22 || New York Islanders || 4–3 || 6–1–0 || 12 || 
|- style="background:#fcf;"
| 8 || October 23 || Winnipeg Jets || 6–9 || 6–2–0 || 12 || 
|- style="background:#cfc;"
| 9 || October 26 || @ Quebec Nordiques || 4–2 || 7–2–0 || 14 || 
|- style="background:#cfc;"
| 10 || October 27 || @ Ottawa Senators || 5–2 || 8–2–0 || 16 || 
|- style="background:#fcf;"
| 11 || October 30 || @ New Jersey Devils || 3–5 || 8–3–0 || 16 || 
|- style="background:#cfc;"
| 12 || October 31 || @ Chicago Blackhawks || 9–6 || 9–3–0 || 18 || 
|-

|- style="background:#cfc;"
| 13 || November 2 || @ Florida Panthers || 4–3 || 10–3–0 || 20 || 
|- style="background:#cfc;"
| 14 || November 4 || Quebec Nordiques || 4–1 || 11–3–0 || 22 || 
|- style="background:#fcf;"
| 15 || November 6 || @ Toronto Maple Leafs || 3–5 || 11–4–0 || 22 || 
|- style="background:#fcf;"
| 16 || November 7 || Vancouver Canucks || 2–5 || 11–5–0 || 22 || 
|- style="background:#cfc;"
| 17 || November 10 || @ Buffalo Sabres || 5–3 || 12–5–0 || 24 || 
|- style="background:#fcf;"
| 18 || November 11 || New Jersey Devils || 3–5 || 12–6–0 || 24 || 
|- style="background:#fcf;"
| 19 || November 13 || Buffalo Sabres || 2–7 || 12–7–0 || 24 || 
|- style="background:#fcf;"
| 20 || November 16 || @ Pittsburgh Penguins || 5–11 || 12–8–0 || 24 || 
|- style="background:#cfc;"
| 21 || November 18 || Hartford Whalers || 6–3 || 13–8–0 || 26 || 
|- style="background:#ffc;"
| 22 || November 20 || @ Boston Bruins || 5–5 OT || 13–8–1 || 27 || 
|- style="background:#fcf;"
| 23 || November 21 || New York Islanders || 4–5 OT || 13–9–1 || 27 || 
|- style="background:#cfc;"
| 24 || November 24 || Montreal Canadiens || 9–2 || 14–9–1 || 29 || 
|- style="background:#cfc;"
| 25 || November 26 || Tampa Bay Lightning || 3–0 || 15–9–1 || 31 || 
|- style="background:#cfc;"
| 26 || November 27 || @ Tampa Bay Lightning || 4–3 OT || 16–9–1 || 33 || 
|-

|- style="background:#fcf;"
| 27 || December 1 || @ Edmonton Oilers || 1–3 || 16–10–1 || 33 || 
|- style="background:#cfc;"
| 28 || December 2 || @ Vancouver Canucks || 6–3 || 17–10–1 || 35 || 
|- style="background:#fcf;"
| 29 || December 4 || @ Calgary Flames || 0–6 || 17–11–1 || 35 || 
|- style="background:#fcf;"
| 30 || December 9 || Washington Capitals || 2–4 || 17–12–1 || 35 || 
|- style="background:#fcf;"
| 31 || December 11 || @ New York Islanders || 2–5 || 17–13–1 || 35 || 
|- style="background:#fcf;"
| 32 || December 12 || Edmonton Oilers || 1–2 || 17–14–1 || 35 || 
|- style="background:#cfc;"
| 33 || December 16 || Quebec Nordiques || 3–2 || 18–14–1 || 37 || 
|- style="background:#ffc;"
| 34 || December 18 || Chicago Blackhawks || 2–2 OT || 18–14–2 || 38 || 
|- style="background:#fcf;"
| 35 || December 19 || @ New Jersey Devils || 2–4 || 18–15–2 || 38 || 
|- style="background:#fcf;"
| 36 || December 21 || Washington Capitals || 1–4 || 18–16–2 || 38 || 
|- style="background:#fcf;"
| 37 || December 23 || Detroit Red Wings || 1–3 || 18–17–2 || 38 || 
|- style="background:#cfc;"
| 38 || December 27 || @ Buffalo Sabres || 2–0 || 19–17–2 || 40 || 
|- style="background:#ffc;"
| 39 || December 28 || @ Pittsburgh Penguins || 4–4 OT || 19–17–3 || 41 || 
|- style="background:#cfc;"
| 40 || December 31 || @ Boston Bruins || 4–3 || 20–17–3 || 43 || 
|-
| colspan="7" style="text-align:center;"|
Notes:
 Neutral site game played at the Met Center in Bloomington, Minnesota.
|-

|- style="background:#fcf;"
| 41 || January 6 || @ Dallas Stars || 0–8 || 20–18–3 || 43 || 
|- style="background:#fcf;"
| 42 || January 8 || @ Tampa Bay Lightning || 2–4 || 20–19–3 || 43 || 
|- style="background:#cfc;"
| 43 || January 11 || Ottawa Senators || 4–1 || 21–19–3 || 45 || 
|- style="background:#cfc;"
| 44 || January 13 || Boston Bruins || 6–2 || 22–19–3 || 47 || 
|- style="background:#fcf;"
| 45 || January 14 || @ New York Rangers || 2–5 || 22–20–3 || 47 || 
|- style="background:#cfc;"
| 46 || January 16 || Los Angeles Kings || 5–2 || 23–20–3 || 49 || 
|- style="background:#cfc;"
| 47 || January 19 || St. Louis Blues || 8–3 || 24–20–3 || 51 || 
|- style="background:#fcf;"
| 48 || January 25 || @ Quebec Nordiques || 4–6 || 24–21–3 || 51 || 
|- style="background:#fcf;"
| 49 || January 29 || Washington Capitals || 2–4 || 24–22–3 || 51 || 
|- style="background:#fcf;"
| 50 || January 30 || @ Montreal Canadiens || 4–5 OT || 24–23–3 || 51 || 
|-

|- style="background:#fcf;"
| 51 || February 2 || Washington Capitals || 2–5 || 24–24–3 || 51 || 
|- style="background:#fcf;"
| 52 || February 3 || San Jose Sharks || 2–3 OT || 24–25–3 || 51 || 
|- style="background:#fcf;"
| 53 || February 5 || @ Boston Bruins || 0–4 || 24–26–3 || 51 || 
|- style="background:#ffc;"
| 54 || February 8 || @ Ottawa Senators || 3–3 OT || 24–26–4 || 52 || 
|- style="background:#cfc;"
| 55 || February 10 || Florida Panthers || 4–3 OT || 25–26–4 || 54 || 
|- style="background:#fcf;"
| 56 || February 11 || @ Detroit Red Wings || 3–6 || 25–27–4 || 54 || 
|- style="background:#fcf;"
| 57 || February 13 || Pittsburgh Penguins || 0–3 || 25–28–4 || 54 || 
|- style="background:#cfc;"
| 58 || February 15 || @ San Jose Sharks || 6–4 || 26–28–4 || 56 || 
|- style="background:#fcf;"
| 59 || February 16 || @ Mighty Ducks of Anaheim || 3–6 || 26–29–4 || 56 || 
|- style="background:#cfc;"
| 60 || February 18 || @ Los Angeles Kings || 4–3 || 27–29–4 || 58 || 
|- style="background:#cfc;"
| 61 || February 21 || Montreal Canadiens || 8–7 || 28–29–4 || 60 || 
|- style="background:#cfc;"
| 62 || February 24 || New York Islanders || 5–4 OT || 29–29–4 || 62 || 
|- style="background:#fcf;"
| 63 || February 25 || @ New York Islanders || 0–2 || 29–30–4 || 62 || 
|- style="background:#fcf;"
| 64 || February 28 || @ New York Rangers || 1–4 || 29–31–4 || 62 || 
|-
| colspan="7" style="text-align:center;"|
Notes:
 Neutral site game played at the Richfield Coliseum in Richfield Township, Ohio.
|-

|- style="background:#ffc;"
| 65 || March 4 || @ Washington Capitals || 3–3 OT || 29–31–5 || 63 || 
|- style="background:#cfc;"
| 66 || March 6 || @ Tampa Bay Lightning || 3–1 || 30–31–5 || 65 || 
|- style="background:#fcf;"
| 67 || March 8 || Dallas Stars || 3–4 OT || 30–32–5 || 65 || 
|- style="background:#cfc;"
| 68 || March 10 || Ottawa Senators || 8–2 || 31–32–5 || 67 || 
|- style="background:#ffc;"
| 69 || March 12 || @ Montreal Canadiens || 4–4 OT || 31–32–6 || 68 || 
|- style="background:#ffc;"
| 70 || March 13 || Tampa Bay Lightning || 5–5 OT || 31–32–7 || 69 || 
|- style="background:#fcf;"
| 71 || March 19 || Hartford Whalers || 3–5 || 31–33–7 || 69 || 
|- style="background:#fcf;"
| 72 || March 20 || @ Florida Panthers || 3–5 || 31–34–7 || 69 || 
|- style="background:#cfc;"
| 73 || March 22 || @ St. Louis Blues || 6–3 || 32–34–7 || 71 || 
|- style="background:#cfc;"
| 74 || March 24 || Florida Panthers || 4–3 || 33–34–7 || 73 || 
|- style="background:#fcf;"
| 75 || March 26 || @ New Jersey Devils || 2–7 || 33–35–7 || 73 || 
|- style="background:#fcf;"
| 76 || March 27 || Mighty Ducks of Anaheim || 2–3 OT || 33–36–7 || 73 || 
|- style="background:#fcf;"
| 77 || March 29 || New York Rangers || 3–4 || 33–37–7 || 73 || 
|- style="background:#fcf;"
| 78 || March 31 || Calgary Flames || 1–4 || 33–38–7 || 73 || 
|-

|- style="background:#cfc;"
| 79 || April 2 || @ Hartford Whalers || 6–5 || 34–38–7 || 75 || 
|- style="background:#ffc;"
| 80 || April 4 || @ Winnipeg Jets || 2–2 OT || 34–38–8 || 76 || 
|- style="background:#ffc;"
| 81 || April 7 || Florida Panthers || 3–3 OT || 34–38–9 || 77 || 
|- style="background:#fcf;"
| 82 || April 10 || Boston Bruins || 3–4 || 34–39–9 || 77 || 
|- style="background:#cfc;"
| 83 || April 12 || New Jersey Devils || 4–2 || 35–39–9 || 79 || 
|- style="background:#ffc;"
| 84 || April 14 || @ New York Rangers || 2–2 OT || 35–39–10 || 80 || 
|-

|-
| Legend:

Player statistics

Scoring
 Position abbreviations: C = Center; D = Defense; G = Goaltender; LW = Left Wing; RW = Right Wing
  = Joined team via a transaction (e.g., trade, waivers, signing) during the season. Stats reflect time with the Flyers only.
  = Left team via a transaction (e.g., trade, waivers, release) during the season. Stats reflect time with the Flyers only.

Goaltending
  = Joined team via a transaction (e.g., trade, waivers, signing) during the season. Stats reflect time with the Flyers only.

Awards and records

Awards

Records

Among the team records set during the 1993–94 season was Kevin Dineen tying the team record for goals scored in a single game (4) on October 31. Eric Lindros tied the team single period records for most goals (3) and points (4) on January 19. A month later on February 15, Mikael Renberg matched the goals in single period record and on April 2, Lindros matched the points in a single period record. On the season, Renberg’s 82 points is a franchise rookie record and Gary Galley’s 60 assists is a franchise high for defensemen.

Transactions
The Flyers were involved in the following transactions from June 10, 1993, the day after the deciding game of the 1993 Stanley Cup Finals, through June 14, 1994, the day of the deciding game of the 1994 Stanley Cup Finals.

Trades

Players acquired

Players lost

Signings

Draft picks

NHL Entry Draft
Philadelphia's picks at the 1993 NHL Entry Draft, which was held at the Colisée de Québec in Quebec City on June 26–27, 1993. The Flyers traded their first-round picks in 1993, 10th overall, and 1994 along with Steve Duchesne, Ron Hextall, Kerry Huffman, Mike Ricci, Chris Simon, the rights to Peter Forsberg, and $15 million to the Quebec Nordiques for the rights to Eric Lindros on June 30, 1992. They also traded their third-round pick, 62nd overall, to the Pittsburgh Penguins along with Kjell Samuelsson, Rick Tocchet, and Ken Wregget for the Los Angeles Kings' first-round pick, 15th overall, Brian Benning, and Mark Recchi on February 19, 1992.

NHL Supplemental Draft
Philadelphia's picks at the 1993 NHL Supplemental Draft.

Farm teams
The Flyers were affiliated with the Hershey Bears of the American Hockey League and the Johnstown Chiefs of the ECHL.

Notes

References
General
 
 
 
Specific

1993–94 NHL season by team
1993–94 in American ice hockey by team
1993
Philadelphia
Philadelphia